Anthrenocerus blackburni is a species of beetle, native to Australia.  It is within the genus Anthrenocerus and the family Dermestidae. It is native to the Australian states of Victoria and New South Wales.

References

Dermestidae
Beetles of Australia